The season began on November 15, 2010, new participants were introduced as some of the known cast did not return. Like the third and fourth season the system of the competition was in mixed couples. This season, in addition to the award of six million Chilean pesos, the winning couple will get a zero km car. On December 30, 2010 Valeria Ortega left Calle 7 to join Canal 7 (Chile) being replaced by Alain Soulat on Internet.

Contestants

Juan Pablo Alfonso returns to competition due to Juan Pedro Verdier injury.

Juan Pedro Verdier returns to competition due to Pierre Desarmes injury.

Teams competition

Elimination order

External links
 Official website

2010 Chilean television seasons
2011 Chilean television seasons